The 2008–09 Tampa Bay Lightning season was the 17th season for the franchise in Tampa Bay. After a season of turnover in ownership, management and players, the team had a turbulent regular season. The Lightning failed to qualify for the Stanley Cup playoffs.

Off-season
On June 3, it was announced that head coach John Tortorella would not return to the team despite having one year remaining on his contract.

On June 18, 2008, the NHL Board of Governors approved the sale of the Tampa Bay Lightning. The sale of the Lightning was made to movie and television producer Oren Koules. The deal depended the closing of the financial deal of US$200 million to buy the team and lease the St. Pete Times Forum. Koules, 47, played in Medicine Hat and Calgary in the Western Hockey League (WHL) in the early 1980s. In more recent years, he achieved success with the Saw movie franchise and the television sitcom Two and a Half Men. Among his business partners in the Lightning deal is former NHL player Len Barrie.

On June 24, the Lightning announced that Barry Melrose was hired as the team's new head coach. Melrose had not coached in the NHL since 1995 with the Los Angeles Kings. Since that time, he had served as an analyst for the ESPN networks.

Goaltender Marc Denis' contract was bought-out by the Lightning on June 25, almost two years to the date after his acquisition from the Columbus Blue Jackets. Denis had one year remaining on his contract.

The Lightning acquired the rights to left wingers Ryan Malone and Gary Roberts from the Pittsburgh Penguins in exchange for a conditional draft pick in 2009. Malone then agreed to a seven-year contract with the Lightning two days before he was scheduled to become an unrestricted free agent.

The Lightning acquired the rights to right wing Brian Rolston from the Minnesota Wild in exchange for a conditional draft pick in 2009 or 2010. Rolston would later sign with the New Jersey Devils.

The whirlwind 32 days of questionable moves by new ownership came to a head on July 4 when, despite coming off a recent contract extension, Dan Boyle was traded along with Brad Lukowich to the San Jose Sharks in exchange for Matt Carle (who would be traded in early November), Ty Wishart, a first-round draft pick in 2009 (which was traded in August) and a fourth round draft pick in 2010. Boyle was pressured to waive his no-trade clause by Tampa Bay's ownership, who said they would otherwise place him on waivers where he would likely be claimed by the Atlanta Thrashers. Frustrated at interference in the team's hockey operations by owners Len Barrie and Oren Koules, seven days later, general manager Jay Feaster resigned, despite having three years remaining on his contract. Indeed, Brian Lawton had already taken over the position, though not officially until October 2. John Tortorella would later go on to label the new owners as "cowboys" for these and other dubious moves, a moniker that would stick with them.

On August 29, the Lightning acquired defenceman Andrej Meszaros from the Ottawa Senators in exchange for defenceman Filip Kuba, as well as Alexandre Picard, and a first-round pick in the 2009 NHL Entry Draft (obtained in the Dan Boyle deal with the San Jose Sharks). The Lightning would go on to sign Meszaros to a six-year contract worth $24 million.

On September 18, the Lightning announced that their new team captain would be Vincent Lecavalier.

Preseason
The Tampa Bay Lightning will be playing five pre-season games before opening the season against the New York Rangers on October 4 in Prague. Of special note, this is the first time that Tampa Bay will be opening the season outside of North America. This will also be the first time that the Lightning will play a pre-season game outside North America, playing Eisbären Berlin in Germany on September 28. It was announced later that the Lightning would also play against Slovan Bratislava of the Slovak Extraliga on September 30.

Note: all times EST and bold games are home games.

Regular season
The Lightning struggled on the penalty kill, finishing the regular season with the most power-play opportunities against (405) and the most power-play goals allowed (89).

Divisional standings

Conference standings

Game log

|- align="center" bgcolor="#ffbbbb"
| 1 || October 4 || New York Rangers || 1 – 2 || Prague† || 17,085 || 0-1-0 || 0
|- align="center" bgcolor="#ffbbbb"
| 2 || October 5 || New York Rangers || 1 – 2 || Prague‡ || 17,085 || 0-2-0 || 0
|- align="center" bgcolor="#ffffff"
| 3 || October 11 || Carolina Hurricanes || 3 – 4 OT || St. Pete Times Forum || 18,552 || 0-2-1 || 1
|- align="center" bgcolor="#ffffff"
| 4 || October 16 || New York Islanders || 3 – 4 OT || St. Pete Times Forum || 14,420 || 0-2-2 || 2
|- align="center" bgcolor="#ffffff"
| 5 || October 18 || Minnesota Wild || 0 – 1 SO|| St. Pete Times Forum || 15,191 || 0-2-3 || 3
|- align="center" bgcolor="#bbffbb"
| 6 || October 21 || Atlanta Thrashers || 3 – 2 OT || St. Pete Times Forum || 13,922 || 1-2-3 || 5
|- align="center" bgcolor="#ffbbbb"
| 7 || October 25 || San Jose Sharks || 0 – 3 || St. Pete Times Forum || 16,831 || 1-3-3 || 5
|- align="center" bgcolor="#bbffbb"
| 8 || October 28 || Toronto Maple Leafs || 3 – 2 || Air Canada Centre || 19,348 || 2-3-3 || 7
|- align="center" bgcolor="#bbffbb"
| 9 || October 30 || Buffalo Sabres || 5 – 2 || HSBC Arena || 18,690 || 3-3-3 || 9
|-
| colspan=8 |† Tampa Bay was the designated 'home' team on October 4.‡ New York Rangers were the designated 'home' team on October 5.
|-

|- align="center" bgcolor="#bbffbb"
| 10 || November 1 || Ottawa Senators || 3 – 2 || St. Pete Times Forum || 16,104 || 4-3-3 || 11
|- align="center" bgcolor="#ffffff"
| 11 || November 5 || New Jersey Devils || 3 – 4 SO || Prudential Center || 11,619 ||  4-3-4 || 12
|- align="center" bgcolor="#ffbbbb"
| 12 || November 6 || New York Rangers || 2 – 5 || Madison Square Garden || 18,200 || 4-4-4 || 12
|- align="center" bgcolor="#bbffbb"
| 13 || November 8 || Philadelphia Flyers || 2 – 1 || Wachovia Center || 19,412 || 5-4-4 || 14
|- align="center" bgcolor="#ffbbbb"
| 14 || November 10 || Washington Capitals || 2 – 4 || Verizon Center || 17,932 || 5-5-4 || 14
|- align="center" bgcolor="#ffbbbb"
| 15 || November 12 || Florida Panthers || 0 – 4 || BankAtlantic Center || 12,104 || 5-6-4 || 14
|- align="center" bgcolor="#ffbbbb"
| 16 || November 13 || Detroit Red Wings || 3 – 4 || St. Pete Times Forum || 20,544 || 5-7-4 || 14
|- align="center" bgcolor="#ffffff"
| 17 || November 16 || Carolina Hurricanes || 2 – 3 SO || RBC Center || 13,781 || 5-7-5 || 15
|- align="center" bgcolor="#ffffff"
| 18 || November 18 || Florida Panthers || 3 – 4 SO || St. Pete Times Forum || 16,176 || 5-7-6 || 16
|- align="center" bgcolor="#bbffbb"
| 19 || November 21 || Nashville Predators || 4 – 1 || St. Pete Times Forum || 16,444 || 6-7-6 || 18
|- align="center" bgcolor="#ffbbbb"
| 20 || November 23 || New Jersey Devils || 3 – 7 || St. Pete Times Forum || 14,222 || 6-8-6 || 18
|- align="center" bgcolor="#ffffff"
| 21 || November 26 || New York Rangers || 2 – 3 SO || St. Pete Times Forum || 16,991 || 6-8-7 || 19
|- align="center" bgcolor="#ffbbbb"
| 22 || November 28 || Minnesota Wild || 2 – 4 || Xcel Energy Center || 18,568 || 6-9-7 || 19
|- align="center" bgcolor="#ffbbbb"
| 23 || November 29 || Colorado Avalanche || 3 – 4 || Pepsi Center || 18,007 || 6-10-7 || 19
|-

|- align="center" bgcolor="#ffffff"
| 24 || December 2 || Philadelphia Flyers || 3 – 4 OT || Wachovia Center || 19,227 || 6-10-8 || 20
|- align="center" bgcolor="#ffbbbb"
| 25 || December 4 || Boston Bruins || 1 – 3 || St. Pete Times Forum || 15,598 || 6-11-8 || 20
|- align="center" bgcolor="#ffbbbb"
| 26 || December 6 || Buffalo Sabres || 3 – 4 || St. Pete Times Forum || 17,154 || 6-12-8 || 20
|- align="center" bgcolor="#ffbbbb"
| 27 || December 8 || Boston Bruins || 3 – 5 || TD Banknorth Garden || 16,973 || 6-13-8 || 20
|- align="center" bgcolor="#ffbbbb"
| 28 || December 10 || Buffalo Sabres || 2 – 4 || HSBC Arena || 18,431 || 6-14-8 || 20
|- align="center" bgcolor="#bbffbb"
| 29 || December 11 || Montreal Canadiens || 3 – 1 || Bell Centre || 21,273 || 7-14-8 || 22
|- align="center" bgcolor="#ffbbbb"
| 30 || December 13 || Ottawa Senators || 0 – 2 || Scotiabank Place || 18,446 || 7-15-8 || 22
|- align="center" bgcolor="ffffff"
| 31 || December 18 || Colorado Avalanche || 1 – 2 SO || St. Pete Times Forum || 16,333 || 7-15-9 || 23
|- align="center" bgcolor="#ffbbbb"
| 32 || December 20 || Atlanta Thrashers || 3 – 4 || Philips Arena || 14,395 || 7-16-9 || 23
|- align="center" bgcolor="#bbffbb"
| 33 || December 23 || Pittsburgh Penguins || 2 – 0 || Mellon Arena || 17,064 || 8-16-9 || 25
|- align="center" bgcolor="#bbffbb"
| 34 || December 26 || Florida Panthers || 4 – 3 SO || BankAtlantic Center || 16,961 || 9-16-9 || 27
|- align="center" bgcolor="#bbffbb"
| 35 || December 27 || Florida Panthers || 6 – 4 || St. Pete Times Forum || 18,226 || 10-16-9 || 29
|- align="center" bgcolor="ffffff"
| 36 || December 30 || Montreal Canadiens || 1 – 2 SO || St. Pete Times Forum || 20,454 || 10-16-10 || 30
|-

|- align="center" bgcolor="ffbbbb"
| 37 || January 1 || Washington Capitals || 4 – 7 || Verizon Center || 18,227 || 10-17-10 || 30
|- align="center" bgcolor="ffbbbb"
| 38 || January 3 || Carolina Hurricanes || 2 – 3 || St. Pete Times Forum || 15,873 || 10-18-10 || 30
|- align="center" bgcolor="bbffbb"
| 39 || January 4 || Atlanta Thrashers || 4 – 1 || Philips Arena || 10,750 || 11-18-10 || 32
|- align="center" bgcolor="ffbbbb"
| 40 || January 8 || Phoenix Coyotes || 1 – 4 || Jobing.com Arena || 13,736 || 11-19-10 || 32
|- align="center" bgcolor="bbffbb"
| 41 || January 9 || Anaheim Ducks || 4 – 3 || Honda Center || 17,174 || 12-19-10 || 34
|- align="center" bgcolor="bbffbb"
| 42 || January 12 || Los Angeles Kings || 3 – 1 || Staples Center || 16,511 || 13-19-10 || 36
|- align="center" bgcolor="ffbbbb"
| 43 || January 13 || San Jose Sharks || 1 – 7 || HP Pavilion at San Jose || 17,496 || 13-20-10 || 36
|- align="center" bgcolor="bbffbb"
| 44 || January 15 || Philadelphia Flyers || 4 – 1 || St. Pete Times Forum || 15,604 || 14-20-10 || 38
|- align="center" bgcolor="ffbbbb"
| 45 || January 17 || Florida Panthers || 3 – 4 || St. Pete Times Forum || 17,217 || 14-21-10 || 38
|- align="center" bgcolor="bbffbb"
| 46 || January 19 || Dallas Stars || 4 – 2 || St. Pete Times Forum || 13,991 || 15-21-10 || 40
|- align="center" bgcolor="bbffbb"
| 47 || January 21 || Buffalo Sabres || 5 – 3 || St. Pete Times Forum || 15,611 || 16-21-10 || 42
|- align="center" bgcolor="bbffbb"
| 48 || January 27 || Montreal Canadiens || 5 – 3 || St. Pete Times Forum || 15,912 || 17-21-10 || 44
|- align="center" bgcolor="ffbbbb"
| 49 || January 29 || Carolina Hurricanes || 2 – 3 || RBC Center || 16,405 || 17-22-10 || 44
|- align="center" bgcolor="ffbbbb"
| 50 || January 30 || Philadelphia Flyers || 1 – 6 || St. Pete Times Forum || 18,120 || 17-23-10 || 44
|-

|- align="center" bgcolor="ffbbbb"
| 51 || February 3 || New York Islanders || 1 – 3 || Nassau Veterans Memorial Coliseum || 9,808 || 17-24-10 || 44
|- align="center" bgcolor="ffffff"
| 52 || February 4 || Pittsburgh Penguins || 3 – 4 OT || Mellon Arena || 16,977 || 17-24-11 || 45
|- align="center" bgcolor="bbffbb"
| 53 || February 7 || New York Islanders || 1 – 0 || St. Pete Times Forum || 14,810 || 18-24-11 || 47
|- align="center" bgcolor="ffbbbb"
| 54 || February 10 || Atlanta Thrashers || 1 – 3 || St. Pete Times Forum || 13,490 || 18-25-11 || 47
|- align="center" bgcolor="bbffbb"
| 55 || February 12 || Toronto Maple Leafs || 6 – 4 || St. Pete Times Forum || 16,526 || 19-25-11 || 49
|- align="center" bgcolor="ffbbbb"
| 56 || February 14 || Washington Capitals || 1 – 5 || St. Pete Times Forum || 17,249 || 19-26-11 || 49
|- align="center" bgcolor="ffbbbb"
| 57 || February 17 || Chicago Blackhawks || 3 – 5 || St. Pete Times Forum || 15,431 || 19-27-11 || 49
|- align="center" bgcolor="ffffff"
| 58 || February 19 || New Jersey Devils || 2 – 3 SO || St. Pete Times Forum || 14,408 || 19-27-12 || 50
|- align="center" bgcolor="ffbbbb"
| 59 || February 20 || Carolina Hurricanes || 1 – 4 || RBC Center || 17,711 || 19-28-12 || 50
|- align="center" bgcolor="bbffbb"
| 60 || February 22 || Boston Bruins || 4 – 3 || St. Pete Times Forum || 18,454 || 20-28-12 || 52
|- align="center" bgcolor="ffbbbb"
| 61 || February 24 || Edmonton Oilers || 3 – 5 || Rexall Place || 16,839 || 20-29-12 || 52
|- align="center" bgcolor="ffbbbb"
| 62 || February 27 || Vancouver Canucks || 1 – 2 || General Motors Place || 18,630 || 20-30-12 || 52
|-

|- align="center" bgcolor="bbffbb"
| 63 || March 1 || Calgary Flames || 8 – 6 || Pengrowth Saddledome || 19,289 || 21-30-12 || 54
|- align="center" bgcolor="ffbbbb"
| 64 || March 3 || Pittsburgh Penguins || 1 – 3 || St. Pete Times Forum || 19,908 || 21-31-12 || 54
|- align="center" bgcolor="ffffff"
| 65 || March 6 || St. Louis Blues || 3 – 4 OT || St. Pete Times Forum || 13,831 || 21-31-13 || 55
|- align="center" bgcolor="ffbbbb"
| 66 || March 7 || Carolina Hurricanes || 3 – 9 || St. Pete Times Forum || 15,692 || 21-32-13 || 55
|- align="center" bgcolor="ffffff"
| 67 || March 11 || Ottawa Senators || 2 – 3 OT || Scotiabank Place || 19,231 || 21-32-14 || 56
|- align="center" bgcolor="bbffbb"
| 68 || March 12 || Toronto Maple Leafs || 4 – 1 || Air Canada Centre || 19,209 || 22-32-14 || 58
|- align="center" bgcolor="bbffbb"
| 69 || March 14 || Florida Panthers || 4 – 3 SO || BankAtlantic Center || 17,734 || 23-32-14 || 60
|- align="center" bgcolor="ffffff"
| 70 || March 17 || Toronto Maple Leafs || 3 – 4 SO || St. Pete Times Forum || 18,793 || 23-32-15 || 61
|- align="center" bgcolor="ffbbbb"
| 71 || March 19 || Washington Capitals || 2 – 5 || St. Pete Times Forum || 16,541 || 23-33-15 || 61
|- align="center" bgcolor="ffffff"
| 72 || March 21 || Atlanta Thrashers || 3 – 4 SO || St. Pete Times Forum || 15,391 || 23-33-16 || 62
|- align="center" bgcolor="bbffbb"
| 73 || March 24 || Columbus Blue Jackets || 2 – 1 OT || St. Pete Times Forum || 14,454 || 24-33-16 || 64
|- align="center" bgcolor="ffffff"
| 74 || March 26 || Montreal Canadiens || 2 – 3 OT || Bell Centre || 21,273 || 24-33-17 || 65
|- align="center" bgcolor="ffbbbb"
| 75 || March 27 || Washington Capitals || 3 – 5 || Verizon Center || 18,277 || 24-34-17 || 65
|- align="center" bgcolor="ffbbbb"
| 76 || March 29 || Ottawa Senators || 0 – 3 || St. Pete Times Forum || 16,427 || 24-35-17 || 65
|- align="center" bgcolor="ffbbbb"
| 77 || March 31 || Boston Bruins || 1 – 3 || TD Banknorth Garden || 16,996 || 24-36-17 || 65
|-

|- align="center" bgcolor="ffffff"
| 78 || April 3 || New Jersey Devils || 4 – 5 OT || Prudential Center || 17,625 || 24-36-18 || 66
|- align="center" bgcolor="ffbbbb"
| 79 || April 4 || New York Islanders || 1 – 3 || Nassau Veterans Memorial Coliseum || 12,809 || 24-37-18 || 66
|- align="center" bgcolor="ffbbbb"
| 80 || April 7 || Pittsburgh Penguins || 4 – 6 || St. Pete Times Forum || 19,538 || 24-38-18 || 66
|- align="center" bgcolor="ffbbbb"
| 81 || April 9 || Washington Capitals || 2 – 4 || St. Pete Times Forum || 18,891 || 24-39-18 || 66
|- align="center" bgcolor="ffbbbb"
| 82 || April 11 || Atlanta Thrashers || 2 – 6 || Philips Arena || 17,122 || 24-40-18 || 66
|-

|-
| Schedule

Record vs. Opponents

Notes: * denotes division winner; teams in bold are in the Southeast Division; teams in italics qualified for the playoffs; points refer to the points achieved by the team whom the Thrashers played against

 = Member of the Atlantic Division  = Member of the Northeast Division  = Member of the Southeast Division  = Member of the Central Division  = Member of the Northeast Division  = Member of the Pacific Division

Playoffs
The Tampa Bay Lightning failed to qualify for the 2009 NHL playoffs.

Player stats

Skaters

Goaltenders

†Denotes player spent time with another team before joining Lightning. Stats reflect season totals.
‡Traded mid-season
Bold/italics denotes franchise record

Awards and records

Records

Milestones

Transactions

Trades

Free agents

Claimed from waivers

Draft picks

Tampa Bay entered the NHL Draft Lottery with a 48.8% chance of winning the lottery after stumbling to a 31–42–9 record in the regular season. The Lightning finished last in the league just four years after winning their first Stanley Cup.

Tampa Bay's picks at the 2008 NHL Entry Draft  in Ottawa, Ontario.

See also
2008–09 NHL season

Farm teams

References

Tampa Bay Lightning seasons
T
T
Tamp
Tamp